Roye is a commune in the Somme department in Hauts-de-France in northern France.

Geography

Population

History

In 1634, religious refugees from Seville, Spain, known as the illuministes tried to establish themselves in France. They claimed to be inspired by celestial messages. Pierre Guérin, curate of Saint-Georges, was converted and himself created many disciples, called "les Guérinistes". The Catholic Church sought out and executed all of them by 1635.
In 2015, a shooting took place in travelers' camp in which four people died.

Places of interest
 Church of Saint Pierre. Rebuilt in concrete in 1930 after considerable damage during the First World War. The 12th century choir and apse and the 15th century stained-glass windows were all saved.
 The Hôtel de Ville (Town hall), built between 1775 and 1777  by the architect Pierre Dercheu was blown-up with dynamite by the retreating Germans on 17 March 1917. The new building, by local architect Arthur Régnier, was completed in 1932. It is reminiscent of the original by Dercheu.

Personalities
 Gracchus Babeuf, a protagonist during the French revolution was born nearby and lived and worked here.
 Pierre Guérin, an illuministe preacher. Curate of Saint-Georges church, Roye
 Abbot Jules Corblet (1819–1886), hagiographer for the diocese of Amiens.

See also
Communes of the Somme department
Raymond Couvègnes

References

External links

 Official Roye website 

Communes of Somme (department)
Picardy